Peter John McGauran (born 16 November 1955) is a former Australian politician who served as a National Party member of the Australian House of Representatives. He represented the Division of Gippsland in Victoria from 5 March 1983 to 9 April 2008. He is the brother of former Senator Julian McGauran. He was born in Yallourn, Victoria, and was educated at Xavier College, Kew and the University of Melbourne. He was a barrister and solicitor before entering politics.

McGauran was an active member of the Young Nationals and was accorded the accolade of 'Mr YNP Pin-Up Boy' at the 1983 NSW Young Nationals State Ball held in Moree.

McGauran was appointed Minister for Science and Technology in the Howard government in 1996, however, on 26 September 1997, he was forced to resign his position due to ministerial impropriety in relation to the "Travel Rorts" affair. He returned to the ministry in 1998, as Minister for the Arts and the Centenary of Federation 1998–2001, Minister for Science 2001–04, and Minister for Citizenship and Multicultural Affairs 2004–05. In July 2005 he was promoted to Cabinet and became Minister for Agriculture, Fisheries and Forestry, a position he held until 3 December 2007, the Howard Government having been defeated by the Australian Labor Party under Kevin Rudd at the 24 November election.

After the resignation of Nationals leader Mark Vaile, McGauran was expected to seek the leadership; however he dropped out of the race, stating that it was time for younger members to contribute to the party, and that he looked forward to using his experience to help them.

On 4 April 2008, McGauran announced he would shortly be resigning from parliament, citing plans to pursue interests in the thoroughbred racing industry. His resignation was effective on 9 April. He was succeeded by Darren Chester in the resulting June 2008 by-election.

After announcing his resignation, he revealed events that occurred in 1996, where he was physically assaulted by Alphonse Gangitano, an underworld figure who was later murdered. In January 2018, McGauran was appointed by Trade Minister Steven Ciobo as the Consul-General of Australia in Houston, Texas.

References

External links
Newspaper article on Peter McGauran

1955 births
Living people
Australian diplomats
Australian people of Irish descent
National Party of Australia members of the Parliament of Australia
Melbourne Law School alumni
Members of the Australian House of Representatives for Gippsland
Members of the Australian House of Representatives
Members of the Cabinet of Australia
People educated at Xavier College
People from Yallourn
21st-century Australian politicians
20th-century Australian politicians
Government ministers of Australia